Novibipalium is a genus of land planarians of the subfamily Bipaliinae (hammerhead flatworms).

Description 
Species of Novibipalium are very similar to those of the related genus Bipalium. The main difference occurs in the copulatory apparatus, which in Novibipalium lacks a well-developed penis papilla, while in Bipalium a penis papilla is present. Novibipalium has a set of folds in the copulatory apparatus that are everted during mating and create a temporary penis.

Species 
The genus Novibipalium contains the following species:
Novibipalium alterifuscatum Kawakatsu, Ogren & Froehlich, 1998
Novibipalium falsifuscatum Kawakatsu, Ogren & Froehlich, 1998
Novibipalium miyukiae Kawakatsu, Sluys & Ogren, 2005
Novibipalium murayamai Kawakatsu, Sluys & Ogren, 2005
Novibipalium trifuscostriatum (Kaburaki, 1922)
Novibipalium venosum (Kaburaki, 1922)

References 

Geoplanidae
Rhabditophora genera